The Sigma APO 150-600mm F5-6.3 DG OS HSM lens is a super-telephoto lens produced by Sigma Corporation.

It is actually a range of two slightly different lenses based on a common design: the Sports and Contemporary. Both lenses feature similar specifications, but there are some notable differences. The Sports model has better weather sealing, more lens elements, a larger size and weight and slightly better optical performance at towards the 600 mm end of its zoom range. The Contemporary model, on the other hand, is built to a cheaper price point but features similar performance. Its performance suffers a little more than the Sport model between 300-600 mm.

References

External links

150-600